Bone Black: Memories of Girlhood (Holt, 1996) is a memoir by bell hooks. It details her childhood experiences as a poor, African-American girl growing up against a background of racial segregation. As described by Kirkus Reviews, "Telling her story in brief vignettes, hooks illuminates each of the elements that composed that world, describing her parents, torn, sometimes to the point of violence, by the pressures that married life brings; an extended family that provided her with room to dream at the same time that it fed her a range of conflicting cues about how to live; a black subculture that instilled a series of painful lessons in color-driven self-evaluation; and finally, a white majority culture that could offer both the benefits of literature and the punishments of racial discrimination."

Further reading
  (Book review – excerpt)

References

1996 non-fiction books
African-American autobiographies
American memoirs
Books by bell hooks
Henry Holt and Company books